Siloam Springs is an unincorporated community in northeast Gentry County, in the U.S. state of Missouri.

The community is located on Missouri Route DD one mile south of the Gentry-Worth county line. Big Muddy Creek flows past the south side of the community. Denver is 3.5 miles to the northwest in Worth County.

History
Various names were Areola Springs, Free Water, Gara, Siloam, and Siloam City. The name may be derived from the ancient site of Siloam in Jerusalem.

References

Unincorporated communities in Gentry County, Missouri
Unincorporated communities in Missouri